On 23 April 2021, a fire in a hospital in Virar, Maharashtra, India killed at least 13 COVID-19 patients.

Background
India is badly affected by the COVID-19 pandemic. Overcrowding and a shortage of oxygen are among the frequent problems caused. On 21 April 2021, 24 COVID patients in a hospital in Nashik, Maharashtra, died after the oxygen supply to their ventilators was interrupted. In 2021, fatal fires at hospitals in India also occurred in Mumbai and Bharuch.

Incident
In the early hours of 23 April 2021, a fire broke out in the intensive care unit of Vijay Vallabh hospital in Virar, a city which is to the north of Mumbai in the Indian state Maharashtra. There were 17 patients in the ward at the time, 13 of whom were killed.

References

2021 disasters in India
2021 fires in Asia
2020s in Maharashtra
April 2021 events in India
Building and structure fires in India
COVID-19 pandemic in India
Disasters in Maharashtra
Hospital fires in Asia
Urban fires in Asia
Hospital fire